Miller's Tavern, now known as Brooke County Historical Museum, is a historic inn and tavern located at Wellsburg, Brooke County, West Virginia. It was built in 1797, and is a two-story, rectangular brick building with a hipped roof.  It sits on a sandstone foundation and lintels.  It is one of the Ohio Valley's oldest surviving examples of Federal architecture.  It has housed the Brooke County Historical Museum since 1973.

It was listed on the National Register of Historic Places in 1978.

This historic building was torn down November 2019 with intentions to erect a municipal building that will house the magistrate court.

References

External links
Brooke County Museum website

History museums in West Virginia
Hotel buildings on the National Register of Historic Places in West Virginia
Federal architecture in West Virginia
Hotel buildings completed in 1797
Buildings and structures in Brooke County, West Virginia
National Register of Historic Places in Brooke County, West Virginia
Drinking establishments on the National Register of Historic Places in West Virginia
Museums in Brooke County, West Virginia
Demolished buildings and structures in West Virginia
Buildings and structures demolished in 2019